Robert Campbell (born 19 May 1961) was a Scottish footballer who played for Dumbarton and Cowdenbeath.

References

1961 births
Scottish footballers
Dumbarton F.C. players
Cowdenbeath F.C. players
Queen of the South F.C. players
Scottish Football League players
Living people
Association football fullbacks